Trend Technologies (formerly called Data Packaging) is an international manufacturer specialising in plastic injection molding with the first facility opening in Mullingar, Ireland in 1985. The company serves the automotive, healthcare, ICT and industrial sectors. The company's subsidiaries are the Cam Fran Tool and Die Company, Stevenson Grantech Limited and Tintarent Limited.

History and present 
On , the European division of the company was registered in Ireland although it is now liquidated, but the parent company still operates in Europe. The company operates ten facilities in nine countries.

International facilities 
Trend Technologies has operations in several countries as detailed in the table below. In September 2016, it was announced that Trend was building a new facility in Pune, India which would increase the current square footage to 80,000 ft2 which is expandable to 120,000 ft2 in order to add tool building and metal stamping resources.

References 

American companies established in 1979
Chino, California
Companies based in San Bernardino County, California
Manufacturing companies based in California
Privately held companies based in California
Multinational companies headquartered in the United States
Injection molding
Plastics companies of the United States
1979 establishments in California
Manufacturing companies established in 1979